The American Champion Sprint Female Horse award is an American Thoroughbred horse racing honor awarded annually to the top female horse in sprint races usually run at a distance of 6 or 7 furlongs.  This category honoring female sprinters became part of the Eclipse Awards program in 2007.

The Daily Racing Form, the National Thoroughbred Racing Association (NTRA), and the National Turf Writers Association joined forces in 1971 to create the Eclipse Award.

Honorees

References
 The Eclipse Awards at the Thoroughbred Racing Associations of America, Inc.

Horse racing awards
Horse racing in the United States